Tramore GAA is a Gaelic Athletic Association club located in Tramore County Waterford, Ireland, with teams in both Gaelic Football and Hurling. Tramore is one of the oldest GAA clubs in County Waterford, having been founded in 1885.

Honours
Waterford Senior Football Championship: 3
 1969, 1971, 1984
 Waterford Intermediate Football Championships: 2
 1967, 2008
 Runners-Up 1963, 1973
 Waterford Intermediate Hurling Championships: 0
 Runners-Up 1969
 Waterford Junior Football Championships: 2
 1972, 1982
 Runners-Up 1919, 1963, 1981, 1991, 2006
 Waterford Junior Hurling Championships: 2
 1982, 2004
 Runners-Up 1981, 1986, 2003, 2013
 Waterford Under-21 Football Championships: 6
 1973, 1975, 1976, 1981, 1994, 1995
 Runners-Up 1968, 1974, 1980, 1983, 1996, 1997, 1999, 2006
Waterford Under 21 'B' Football Championship: 1
 2009
 Waterford Minor Football Championships: 5
 1960, 1962, 1963, 1972, 1993
 Runners-Up 1959, 1971, 1981, 1991, 1992, 1994
 Waterford Minor Hurling Championships: 1
 1972

External links
 * Official Tramore GAA Club Website

Gaelic games clubs in County Waterford
Hurling clubs in County Waterford
Gaelic football clubs in County Waterford